I'm All For You is a ballads-oriented album by Joe Lovano, which critics have called one of his most enjoyable endeavors.  The album features Hank Jones as well as two members who have enjoyed a longstanding relationship with Lovano: George Mraz and Paul Motian.

Reception

David Franklin of JazzTimes wrote "I'm for You: Ballad Songbook (Blue Note) teams him with the veteran pianist Hank Jones (elder brother of Elvin and Thad) and the superb bassist and drummer George Mraz and Paul Motian on a project that explores the possibilities that slower tunes offer to be 'rhythmically diverse and free within the music' while at the same time sustaining the mood of the piece."

Track listing
 "I'm All for You" - 7:50
 "Don't Blame Me" - 7:51
 "Monk's Mood" - 4:01
 "The Summary (A Suite for Pops)" - 5:16
 "Stella by Starlight" - 5:47
 "I Waited for You" - 9:28
 "Like Someone in Love" - 6:50
 "Early Autumn" - 7:31
 "Countdown" - 4:38

Personnel
Hank Jones - piano
Joe Lovano - tenor saxophone
George Mraz - bass
Paul Motian - drums, cymbals

References

External links
 

2006 albums
Joe Lovano albums
Blue Note Records albums